Rapid Ōhia Death (ROD) is a fungal disease that is rapidly killing forests of ōhia (Metrosideros polymorpha)—an ecologically important native tree species within the Hawaiian Islands that has provided a plethora of habitats for endangered birds and other species. Initially reported by landowners in Puna in 2010, ROD spread quickly across tens of thousands of acres of Ōhia trees on the Hawaiian Islands. To date, hundreds of thousands of these trees have died from this fungal disease alone. Previously healthy Ōhia trees have been observed to die within a few days to weeks, which is why the disease is known as "Rapid Ōhia Death".

In April 2018, the cause of Rapid Ōhia Death was identified as two fungal species within the genus Ceratocystis which were previously unknown to science: Ceratocystis huliohia and Ceratocystis lukuohia. By May 2018, infected ōhia trees were found on the island of Kauai, prompting requests that members of the public limit transportation of ōhia products within the island. The less aggressive of the two fungus species, C. huliohia, has been confirmed on Hawaii Island, Kauai, Maui, and Oahu. According to experts, the fungus is likely to have been carried between the islands by tourists, on their shoes or hiking boots, but it can also be transmitted by dirty tools, animals or via the wind. Currently, there is no cure for the infected Ōhia trees; ways to prevent the disease from spreading to other trees is through avoiding transmitting any parts of the tree to other Ōhia's, removing soil debris from shoes, other gear, and tools. In order to fight back against the spread of this disease and to educate citizens on what the disease is, scientists and government officials have created a "ROD Strategic Response Plan," which outlines topics such as what the disease is, how it spreads, and how to prevent it from spreading.

In 2019 a documentary titled Saving Ōhi’a: Hawaii's Sacred Tree, produced by Club Sullivan and funded by a grant from the Hawaii Invasive Species Council, was released, providing an in-depth look into the cultural and ecological importance of ōhia and the environmental and cultural impacts of the ROD epidemic. The film was nominated for six Emmys and received three awards from the National Academy of Television Arts and Sciences Pacific Southwest Chapter.

Types of ROD Pathogens 

Ceratocystis Huliohia: This fungal pathogen was confirmed by plant pathologist Lisa Keith and her lab team in 2014. Keith and her team asked local Hawaiians what they wished to coin the disease as, and they decided to call it Ceratocystis Huliohia (changes the natural state of Ōhia). This fungal pathogen has been found to create a canker disease beneath the bark that slowly spreads throughout the water-conducting tissue within the tree, leading to wilting leaves, dried out branches and ultimately, the death of the tree. In both ROD fungal pathogens, signs of the disease have been shown in the outer ring of the cut trunk. Additionally, scientists have found through systematic dissections of the tree that the darkest portion of the bark is where the fungus has entered, and that predominantly the fungus has been found that the disease grows quicker up the stem of the tree than down it. Researchers have also been studying how the excrement created by Boring Beetle's within the Ōhia tree's can be used as a pathway for both pathogens of ROD.

Ceratocystis Lukuohia: This fungal pathogen is named the destroyer of ʻōhiʻa because unlike Ceratocystis Huliohia, this pathogen spreads quickly throughout the tree and causes a systemic wilt. This pathogen also chokes the tissue in the tree, which disallows it from acquiring water, but, the pathogen spreads much quicker than the Huliohia pathogen and leads to the entire crown of the tree wilting and eventually dying.

Policies and Plans 
Rapid Ōhia Death Strategic Response Plan: In 2020, the Rapid Ōhia Death Working Group released a "Strategic Response Plan for 2020-2024" laying out management, research, and public engagement priorities to contain the disease and calling for $4 million a year in funding over the next five years to "continue progress toward understanding and addressing the fungal disease that has seriously impacted Hawaii's native forests." Within the response plan, researchers have developed a rapid molecular test that identifies the presence of the Ceratocystis pathogens within ʻŌhiʻa trees.  Researchers within the response plan have also developed effective sanitation techniques, such as, applying heat and vacuum-steam to infected materials, which have been shown to treat the pathogens. The Strategic Response Plan has also succeeded in cooperating with the Hawai'i Seed Bank Partnership to form an advocacy coalition that has succeeded in training and educated hundreds of volunteers statewide on how to collect ʻŌhiʻa seeds to further conservation of the species.

References

External links 
 Rapid ohia death: the official resource on the disease maintained by the University of Hawaii 
 Saving Ōhia, Hawaii's Sacred Tree: official website of the documentary
 Rapid Ohia Death Video Brochure on Vimeo

Fungal tree pathogens and diseases